The Van Asch Van Wijck Mountains ( Van Asch van Wijckgebergte) are a mountain range in Suriname. 
They are named after Titus van Asch van Wijck, a governor of Suriname. The most highest mountain in the 721 metre Ebbatop

References

Mountain ranges of Suriname
Sipaliwini District